Sebastián Carrera (born 25 May 1978 in Buenos Aires, Argentina) is an Argentine footballer. He currently plays as a midfielder for Douglas Haig of the Argentine Primera B Nacional.

Career

Carrera started his career in the lower leagues of Argentine football with Dock Sud in 1997. He got his first chance to play in the Argentine Primera in 2000 when he joined Los Andes, but he dropped a division in 2001 to join Almagro.
In 2004 Carrera moved to Spain to play for Real Murcia, he played 65 league games for the club, scoring 5 goals.
In 2006 Carrera returned to Argentina, he played one season with Argentinos Juniors before joining Arsenal de Sarandí in 2007.
In 2011 we joined Atlético de Rafaela to play in Primera División.

Titles

References
Sebastián Carrera at Yahoo! Sports
Sebastián Carrera at Goal.com
 Argentine Primera statistics
 Sebastián Carrera at ESPNdeportes
Guardian Football
 Carrera joined to Rafaela

1978 births
Living people
Footballers from Buenos Aires
Argentine footballers
Argentine expatriate footballers
Argentine people of Basque descent
Association football midfielders
Argentine Primera División players
Primera Nacional players
Segunda División players
Club Atlético Los Andes footballers
Real Murcia players
Club Almagro players
Argentinos Juniors footballers
Arsenal de Sarandí footballers
Asteras Tripolis F.C. players
Atlético de Rafaela footballers
Club Atlético Belgrano footballers
Club Atlético Douglas Haig players
Argentine expatriate sportspeople in Spain
Expatriate footballers in Spain
Expatriate footballers in Greece